Castelo de Castelo Mendo is a castle in Portugal. It is classified as a National Monument.

References

External links
Castelo de Castelo Mendo at Direção-Geral do Património Cultural

Castelo Mendo
National monuments in Guarda District
Castelo Mendo